The Boulders may refer to:

The Boulders (Greencastle, Indiana), see National Register of Historic Places listings in Putnam County, Indiana
The Boulders (Greenwood Lake, New York)